Wrath is the third album by electropop group Iris, released in 2005.  Taking the organic style of Awakening and adding guitars, they created this album with "more of a 'rock' feel" than a "'club' feel".

Track listing

Personnel

Iris
 Reagan Jones - vocals, songwriting, keyboards
 Andrew Sega - keyboards, guitars, programming, production

Additional personnel
 Chris Brickler - guitar on "68"
 Brian Pearson - guitar on "No One Left to Lose"

References

External links

2005 albums
Iris (American band) albums